Jinh Hie Yu Frey (born May 20, 1985) is a Korean-American mixed martial artist and currently competes in the strawweight division of the Ultimate Fighting Championship (UFC). She is the former Invicta FC Atomweight Champion

Background
Frey was born in Arkansas but she grew up in Texas. Frey graduated Palo Duro High School in 3 Years with a Distinguished Achievement Diploma in the top 2% of her class. She then earned her A.A.S. in Nuclear Medicine at Amarillo College. Next she went to Midwestern State University getting a B.S. in Radiologic Sciences and finally she went to University of Texas at Arlington for her Masters in August 2015.

Her father is South Korean, and he died when she was young. She has one older brother, two younger half brothers and one younger half sister. She is married to Douglas Frey.

Mixed martial arts career

Jinh Yu Frey first gained notoriety when she defeated Darla Harris in a MMA fight that went viral online.

Invicta FC

Frey's earlier victories on regional MMA circuit drew the attention of Invicta FC. Jinh Yu Frey's first fight was against Jodie Esquibel which she lost via decision. In her second fight with the organisation she defeated fellow atomweight Cassie Robb.

Frey went on to defeat Liz McCarthy and Hérica Tibúrcio via a pair of unanimous decisions, earning a shot for the Invicta FC Atomweight Championship. Frey challenged Ayaka Hamasaki for the Atomweight Championship at Invicta FC 19: Maia vs. Modafferi on September 23, 2016. She lost the fight via doctor stoppage in the second round.

After the failed title shot, Frey faced Ashley Cummins at Invicta FC 24: Dudieva vs. Borella on July 15, 2017. She won the fight via unanimous decision.

Back in the win column, Frey challenged Seo Hee Ham for the Road FC Women's Atomweight Championship at Road FC 045 XX on December 23, 2017. She lost the fight via knockout in the first round.

Second Invicta FC title shot
After her former foe Ayaka Hamasaki vacated her title, Frey faced Minna Grusander for the vacant Invicta FC Atomweight Championship at Invicta FC 30: Frey vs. Grusander on July 21, 2018. After being mostly outwrestled, Frey won the title via a unanimous decision that was widely regarded as controversial.

Due to the controversial decision, the couple was slated to face in a rematch at Invicta FC 33: Frey vs. Grusander II on December 15, 2018. Frey successfully defended the title, winning the fight via split decision.

After the rematch with Grusander, Frey went on to challenge Ayaka Hamasaki for the Rizin Super Atomweight Championship at Rizin 16: Kobe on June 2, 2019. Frey lost the fight via unanimous decision.

Frey was expected to defend her title as a headliner of Invicta FC 37 in a rematch against Ashley Cummins, but was forced to withdraw from the bout due to an injury. The bout was then rescheduled to Invicta FC 39: Frey vs. Cummins II on February 7, 2020. However, Frey missed the championship weight and vacated her title. The pair fought nevertheless, with Frey winning the bout via unanimous decision.

Ultimate Fighting Championship
Frey made her UFC debut on June 27, 2020, against Kay Hansen at UFC on ESPN: Poirier vs. Hooker. She lost the fight via a submission in round three.

Frey faced Loma Lookboonmee on October 4, 2020 at UFC on ESPN: Holm vs. Aldana. She lost the fight via unanimous decision.

Frey faced Gloria de Paula on March 13, 2021 at UFC Fight Night 187. She won the fight by unanimous decision.

Frey was scheduled to face Istela Nunes on July 31, 2021 at UFC on ESPN 28. However,  Nunes was forced to withdraw from the bout due to visa issues and was replaced by Ashley Yoder.  She won the fight via unanimous decision.

Frey was scheduled to face Hannah Goldy on February 26, 2022 at UFC Fight Night 202.  On February 23, Goldy withdrew from the bout due to illness and the bout was cancelled.
 
Frey faced Vanessa Demopoulos on June 25, 2022 at UFC on ESPN 38. She lost the fight via split decision. 11 of 12 media outlets scored the contest for Frey.

Frey faced Polyana Viana on November 5, 2022 at UFC Fight Night 214. She lost the fight via knockout in the first round.

Championships and accomplishments

Mixed martial arts
Invicta Fighting Championships
Invicta FC Atomweight Champion (One time)
One Successful Title Defense
SCS Atomweight Championship
SCS Atomweight Champion (One time)
One Successful Title Defense

Mixed martial arts record

|-
|Loss
|align=center|11–8
|Polyana Viana
|KO (punches)
|UFC Fight Night: Rodriguez vs. Lemos
|
|align=center|1
|align=center|0:47
|Las Vegas, Nevada, United States
|
|-
|Loss
|align=center|11–7
|Vanessa Demopoulos
|Decision (split)
|UFC on ESPN: Tsarukyan vs. Gamrot
|
|align=center|3
|align=center|5:00
|Las Vegas, Nevada, United States
|
|-
|Win
|align=center|11–6
|Ashley Yoder
|Decision (unanimous)
|UFC on ESPN: Hall vs. Strickland
|
|align=center|3
|align=center|5:00
|Las Vegas, Nevada, United States
|
|-
|Win
|align=center|10–6
|Gloria de Paula
|Decision (unanimous)
|UFC Fight Night: Edwards vs. Muhammad 
|
|align=center|3
|align=center|5:00
|Las Vegas, Nevada, United States
|
|-
|Loss
|align=center|9–6
|Loma Lookboonmee
|Decision (unanimous)
|UFC on ESPN: Holm vs. Aldana
|
|align=center|3
|align=center|5:00
|Abu Dhabi, United Arab Emirates
|
|-
|Loss
|align=center|9–5
|Kay Hansen
|Submission (armbar)
|UFC on ESPN: Poirier vs. Hooker
|
|align=center|3
|align=center|2:26
|Las Vegas, Nevada, United States
|
|-
|Win
| style="text-align:center;"|9–4
|Ashley Cummins
|Decision (unanimous)
|Invicta FC 39: Frey vs. Cummins II
|
| style="text-align:center;"| 5
| style="text-align:center;"| 5:00
|Kansas City, Kansas, United States
|
|-
|Loss
| style="text-align:center;"|8–4
|Ayaka Hamasaki
|Decision (unanimous)
|Rizin 16
|
| style="text-align:center;"| 3
| style="text-align:center;"| 5:00
|Kobe, Japan
|
|-
|Win
| style="text-align:center;"|8–3
|Minna Grusander
|Decision (split)
|Invicta FC 33: Frey vs. Grusander II
|
| style="text-align:center;"| 5
| style="text-align:center;"| 5:00
|Kansas City, Missouri, United States
|
|-
|Win
| style="text-align:center;"|7–3
|Minna Grusander
|Decision (unanimous)
|Invicta FC 30: Frey vs. Grusander
|
| style="text-align:center;"| 5
| style="text-align:center;"| 5:00
|Kansas City, Missouri, United States
|
|-
|Loss
| style="text-align:center;"|6–3
|Seo Hee Ham
|TKO (punches)
|Road FC 045
|
| style="text-align:center;"| 1
| style="text-align:center;"| 4:40
|Seoul, South Korea
|
|-
|Win
| style="text-align:center;"|6–2
|Ashley Cummins
|Decision (unanimous)
|Invicta FC 24: Dudieva vs. Borella
|
| style="text-align:center;"| 3
| style="text-align:center;"| 5:00
|Kansas City, Missouri, United States
|
|-
|Loss
| style="text-align:center;"|5–2
|Ayaka Hamasaki
|TKO (doctor stoppage)
|Invicta FC 19: Maia vs. Modafferi
|
| style="text-align:center;"| 2
| style="text-align:center;"| 4:38
|Kansas City, Missouri, United States
|
|-
|Win
| style="text-align:center;"|5–1
|Hérica Tibúrcio
|Decision (unanimous)
|Invicta FC 16: Hamasaki vs. Brown
|
| style="text-align:center;"| 3
| style="text-align:center;"| 5:00
|Las Vegas, Nevada, United States
|
|-
|Win
| style="text-align:center;"|4–1
|Liz McCarthy
|Decision (unanimous)
|Invicta FC 14: Evinger vs. Kianzad
|
| style="text-align:center;"| 3
| style="text-align:center;"| 5:00
|Kansas City, Missouri, United States
|
|-
|Win
| style="text-align:center;"|3–1
|Cassie Robb
|Submission (rear-naked choke)
|Invicta FC 10: Waterson vs. Tiburcio
|
| style="text-align:center;"| 1
| style="text-align:center;"| 2:36
|Davenport, Iowa, United States
|
|-
|Loss
| style="text-align:center;"|2–1
|Jodie Esquibel
|Decision (split)
|Invicta FC 8: Waterson vs. Tamada
|
| style="text-align:center;"| 3
| style="text-align:center;"| 5:00
|Kansas City, Missouri, United States
|
|-
|Win
| style="text-align:center;"|2–0
|Darla Harris
|KO (head kick and punch)
|SCS 18: Declaration of Pain
|
| style="text-align:center;"| 1
| style="text-align:center;"| 3:13
|Hinton, Oklahoma, United States
|
|-
|Win
| style="text-align:center;"|1–0
|Meghan Wright
|Submission (rear-naked choke)
|SCS 16: Resolution
|
| style="text-align:center;"| 1
| style="text-align:center;"| 2:04
|Hinton, Oklahoma, United States
|
|}

See also
 List of current UFC fighters
 List of female mixed martial artists

References

External links
 
 

1985 births
Living people
People from Crossett, Arkansas
American practitioners of Brazilian jiu-jitsu
Female Brazilian jiu-jitsu practitioners
American female mixed martial artists
Atomweight mixed martial artists
Strawweight mixed martial artists
Mixed martial artists utilizing Brazilian jiu-jitsu
Sportspeople from Arlington, Texas
Mixed martial artists from Texas
American sportspeople of Korean descent
Ultimate Fighting Championship female fighters
21st-century American women